Peter Disera (born 21 February 1995) is a Canadian bicycle racer, who competes in road and mountain biking. Disera's best result on the World Cup circuit is a sixth in 2019.

Career

Olympics
In July 2021, Disera was named to Canada's 2020 Olympic team.

Major results

2013
 1st  National Junior Time Trial Championships
2014
 3rd National Under-23 Time Trial Championships

References
 Profile on MTB Data

Living people
1995 births
Canadian male cyclists
Sportspeople from Kitchener, Ontario
Cyclists at the 2020 Summer Olympics
Olympic cyclists of Canada